John McLean (February 4, 1791 – October 14, 1830) was a United States representative and a Senator from Illinois. He was the brother of Finis McLean and uncle of James David Walker.

Born near Guilford Court House (now Greensboro), Guilford County, North Carolina, February 4, 1791, McLean moved with his parents to Logan County, Kentucky in 1795. He moved to Illinois Territory in 1815.  After studying law, he was admitted to the bar and commenced practice in Shawneetown, Gallatin County, Illinois.  When Illinois was admitted as a State into the Union, McLean was elected to the Fifteenth Congress and served from December 3, 1818, to March 3, 1819. He failed to be re-elected in 1818 to the Sixteenth Congress.  He was also an unsuccessful candidate for congress in the  1820 and 1822 elections. He was elected to the Illinois State House of Representatives in 1820, 1826, and 1828, and served as speaker.

In 1824, McLean was elected to the United States Senate to fill the vacancy created by the resignation of Ninian Edwards and served from November 23, 1824 to March 3, 1825. He was unsuccessful in a bid for re-election, not managing to get more than 12 votes of the 27 needed in the legislature through 10 ballots, but resumed the practice of law.

He was again elected to the United States Senate and served from March 4, 1829, until his death, aged 39, in Shawneetown, Illinois in 1830. He was interred in Westwood Cemetery, near Shawneetown.

Legacy
McLean County, Illinois is named after him.

See also
List of United States Congress members who died in office (1790–1899)

References

External links

1791 births
1830 deaths
Speakers of the Illinois House of Representatives
Democratic Party members of the Illinois House of Representatives
Democratic Party members of the United States House of Representatives from Illinois
Politicians from Greensboro, North Carolina
Illinois Democratic-Republicans
Democratic-Republican Party United States senators
Democratic Party United States senators from Illinois
19th-century American politicians